Selkirk railway station served the town of Selkirk, Scottish Borders, Scotland, from 1856 to 1964 on the Selkirk and Galashiels Railway.

History 
The station was opened on 5 April 1856 by the Selkirk and Galashiels Railway. It was situated at the end of Station Road. On the west side was the goods yard which had six sidings and a goods shed. To the north was an engine shed and on the north side was the signal box, which opened in 1893. Initially, there was only Forest Mill nearby but, by 1900, around twelve textile mills had opened in the vicinity to take advantage of the railways. A new stone-built station building was built across the course of the first 25 years of the station's lifespan. The engine shed closed in 1931. The station closed to passengers on 10 September 1951. but it remained open for excursions and goods traffic until 2 November 1964. A private siding remained for a short time. The station was demolished in 1971.

References 

Disused railway stations in the Scottish Borders
Railway stations in Great Britain opened in 1856
Railway stations in Great Britain closed in 1951
1856 establishments in Scotland
1964 disestablishments in Scotland